Ahsas is a Pakistani romantic drama serial aired on Urdu1. Produced by Ice Media & Entertainment and directed by Najaf Bilgarami. The series premiered on 19 October 2016.

Plot
Adil, a successful businessman, leads a peaceful life with his wife, Akira. Adil's son, Zohaib, is unhappy with his career-minded wife, Marium, while his daughter, Nimra, leads a miserable life with her controlling husband, Saqib. Hina is the sole breadwinner of her family, comprising her mother, Ishrat, two younger sisters, Huma and Manaal and a brother Hannan. Hina works as a salesgirl in a jewellery shop. She gets engaged to her colleague, Babar.

Adil gets introduced to Hina when he buys a necklace for Akira from her shop. Akira dies in the next few days, leaving Adil heartbroken. Seeing Babar's selfish behaviour, Hina breaks her engagement and quits the job. She starts working at a restaurant. One day, she bumps into Adil, who informs her about Akira's death. Adil hires Hina as a tutor for his grandson, Zeeshan. Eventually, Adil marries Hina against his children's wishes.

Hina eventually gives birth to a son. Adil dies, leaving a significant part of his property in Hina's name. Nimra, Saqib, Zohaib and Marium conspire against Hina but eventually give up seeing her kindness. Nimra and Zohaib feel touched by Hina's selfless behaviour.

Cast
 Noman Ijaz as Adil
 Sarah Khan as Hina
 Ghana Ali as Marium
 Wahaj Ali as Zohaib
 Yasir Mazhar as Saakim
 Fariya Hassan as Nimra
 Manzoor Qureshi as Bhai jaan
 Nida Mumtaz as Hina's mother 
 Humera Zahid as Huma
 Rida Khan as Manaal
 Yasir as Hadnan
 Heena as Natasha
 Samia Naz as Appa ( Saakim's elder sister )
 Falak (Child actor) as Aima
 Shifa (Child actor) Zeeshaan

Guest appearances 
 Faysal Qureshi as Sarmaat
 Zeba Bakhtiar as Akira
 Laila Wasti as Sanobaar
 Faiza Gillani as Di (Marium's elder sister)
 Noman Habib as Babar

References

2016 Pakistani television series debuts
Urdu-language television shows
Pakistani drama television series